Calcium is a census-designated place (CDP) in Jefferson County, New York, United States. The population was 3,491 as of the 2010 census. The CDP is in the town of Le Ray and includes the hamlets of Calcium and Sanfords Four Corners.

Historic landmarks include the stone house at the intersection of State Route 342 and County Route 138 that once served as the post office for the area, and the Calcium Community Church at the same intersection. The church was built in 1853 by a group of at least three different denominations, including Methodist Episcopal, Christian, and Unitarian. The building was shared by these and various Christian groups over the years, and remains a community church today.

Geography
It is bordered on the east by the developed part of Fort Drum.

The hamlet of Calcium is in the southern part of the CDP, east of U.S. Route 11, while Sanfords Four Corners is in the central part of the CDP along New York State Route 342 east of US-11. Route 11 leads southwest  into Watertown, the Jefferson county seat, and northeast  to Gouverneur. Route 342 leads east along the south edge of Fort Drum  to Black River and west  to Interstate 81. Interstate 781 runs through the northern part of the Calcium CDP, connecting to the east with Iraqi Freedom Drive into Fort Drum and leading west  to I-81.

Demographics

As of the census of 2000, there were 3,346 people, 1,052 households, and 911 families residing in the community. The population density was 598.9 per square mile (231.1/km2). There were 1,134 housing units at an average density of 203.0/sq mi (78.3/km2). The racial makeup of the CDP was 67.30% White, 19.52% African American, 1.23% Native American, 1.64% Asian, 0.36% Pacific Islander, 6.19% from other races, and 3.77% from two or more races. 12.61% of the population were Hispanic or Latino of any race.

There were 1,052 households, out of which 62.1% had children under the age of 18 living with them, 72.6% were married couples living together, 10.9% had a female householder with no husband present, and 13.4% were non-families. 10.1% of all households were made up of individuals, and 1.9% had someone living alone who was 65 years of age or older. The average household size was 3.18 and the average family size was 3.41.

In the community, the population was spread out, with 40.0% under the age of 18, 16.2% from 18 to 24, 34.1% from 25 to 44, 7.2% from 45 to 64, and 2.5% who were 65 years of age or older. The median age was 23 years. For every 100 females, there were 100.4 males. For every 100 females age 18 and over, there were 96.4 males.

The median income for a household in the village was $28,977, and the median income was $30,000.  Males had a median income of $25,243 versus $16,250 for females. The per capita income for the CDP was $10,356. 15.4% of the population and 12.7% of families were below the poverty line. Out of the total population, 17.9% of those under the age of 18 and none of those 65 and older were living below the poverty line.

References

External links
Calcium Community Church

Census-designated places in New York (state)
Hamlets in New York (state)
Census-designated places in Jefferson County, New York
Hamlets in Jefferson County, New York